A dead pool is a game in which the object is guessing when someone will die.

Dead Pool or Deadpool may also refer to:

 Deadpool, a character in the Marvel Comics universe
 Several comic books by this name featuring this character, see List of Deadpool titles
 Deadpool (video game), a 2013 video game
Deadpool (film), a 2016 superhero film
 The Dead Pool (1988), last of the Dirty Harry series of films starring Clint Eastwood
 Dead Pool (professional wrestling), a faction set up for World Championship Wrestling
 The Dead Pool, a stage in Mortal Kombat II
 The point at which a reservoir no longer has enough water to flow downstream of its dam; see

See also
 "Death Pool 100", episode of fifth season of CSI: Miami
 Tontine, sometimes erroneously known as a deathpool or dead pool